Antonio Cicchetti (born 28 March 1952) is an Italian politician, three times mayor of Rieti, and a member of Forza Italia.

Biography 
Cicchetti was born in Rieti, Italy; he became local leader of the Youth Front and, subsequently, of the Italian Social Movement – National Right. In 1975 Cicchetti became City Councilor in the municipality of Rieti and was part of the opposition until 1994.

In 1994 he was elected mayor of Rieti, and was re-elected in 1998; his government ended in 2002.

In 2005 he was elected Councilor at the Lazio regional council, and was re-elected in 2010. From April to June 2010, Cicchetti served as the Culture assessor in the regional government of Renata Polverini, but subsequently got ousted.

In the early elections which took place in February 2013, following the resignation of Polverini, Cicchetti ran again for councilor in the PDL party; he gained 5 thousand votes of preference, but they did not suffice for re-election.

In 2017 Cicchetti ran for the seat of Mayor of Rieti, and got elected for the third time.

Private life 
Cicchetti is married and has children.

References

External links 
 
 Antonio Cicchetti at consiglio.regione.lazio.it

|-

Living people
1952 births
People from Rieti
Forza Italia (2013) politicians
21st-century Italian politicians
20th-century Italian politicians
Mayors of places in Lazio